Birds Australia may refer to:

 Royal Australasian Ornithologists Union, trading name Birds Australia
 Birds of Australia, an article about Australian Birds
 List of Australian birds, a list

See also
 The Birds of Australia (disambiguation)